Le Censeur was a French journal of institutional and legal reform, described sometimes as a Journal Industrialiste, founded in 1814 by Charles Dunoyer and Charles Comte as a platform for their liberal, radical, anti-Bourbon and anti-Bonapartist views. The journal's publication was interrupted due to political difficulties but it reappeared in 1817 under a new title Le Censeur Européen. It was discontinued in 1820 due to repressive press laws.

Publication details 

Le Censeur

 Vol. I June 1814
 Vol. II-X 10 November 1814- 6 September 1815

Le Censeur Europeen

 12 Volumes - Autumn 1817 - 17 April 1819

Notable contributors 
 Jacques Nicolas Augustin Thierry
 Auguste Comte
 Jean-Baptiste Say

References

1814 establishments in France
1820 disestablishments in France
Defunct political magazines published in France
French-language magazines
Magazines established in 1814
Magazines disestablished in 1820